Remy International, Inc. (formerly Delco Remy) headquartered in Pendleton, Indiana is an American manufacturer, remanufacturer, and distributor of light duty starters, alternators, hybrid power technology, and Delco Remy brand heavy duty systems.  Remy has facilities in eleven countries (such as Belgium, Germany, Hungary, United Kingdom, USA, Canada, Mexico and Tunisia) and four different continents around the world.

History

Remy International had its beginnings in 1896 when Frank and Perry Remy opened a home wiring business in Anderson, Indiana. In 1901 the Remy Electric Company was incorporated. Perry Remy had conducted experiments with magneto and by 1910 the company was producing 50,000 magnetos a year.

To prove the dependability of their product, the Remy brothers sent two men on a  journey in 1909. They drove a Remy equipped Buick Four on a ten-week trip from the hills of Kentucky to the swamps of Florida.

The Remy brothers sold their firm to Staughton Fletcher, Jr. and the Fletcher Savings and Trust in 1911 for a reputed one million dollars. Fletcher expanded the product line to include cranking motors, generators, and distributors.

Remy's competition was Dayton Engineering Laboratories Company (Delco) under the leadership of Charles F. Kettering. Kettering also manufactured ignition equipment and generators.

The United States Motor Company purchased the two competitors in 1916 and incorporated them into their operations. The companies remained separated until purchased by General Motors two years later.

In 1918, Delco Remy began operating as a division of General Motors, developing advanced technologies and providing the industry with automotive, heavy duty, and U.S. military products.  A successful General Motors division for more than 75 years, Delco Remy became its own entity in 1994 when a group of private investors bought the heavy duty and automotive divisions.

Delco Remy changed its name to Remy International on August 1, 2004. The company continued to use the Delco Remy brand for some products under license from General Motors.

BorgWarner announced an agreement to acquire Remy on July 13, 2015, and completed the acquisition on November 10, 2015.

Nasdaq listing
On December 13, 2012 Remy International was listed on the Nasdaq stock exchange and CEO John Weber rang the ceremonial opening bell on December 17, 2012.  Approximately one year later, Remy stock was listed to the Nasdaq Global Select Market on December 16, 2013.

USA Industries acquisition
Remy International announced on January 13, 2014 that it would acquire the assets of USA Industries.  USA Industries is a worldwide distributor of remanufactured and new alternators, starters, CV axles, and disc brake calipers. It was founded in 1985 in Bay Shore, New York. Today, USA Industries has over 300 employees with warehousing and distribution centers across the United States.

Products

Heavy duty products
Remy International's heavy duty products are sold under the Delco Remy brand which is licensed from General Motors.  As of 2014, only starters and alternators are manufactured and sold under the Delco Remy brand name. The company sells products as components for new vehicle production in addition to replacement units and parts through various distributors and original equipment dealerships.

Alternators
There are now two main types of heavy duty alternators produced by Remy International.  The first being a typical brush-style alternator, in addition to a brushless-type design.  The brushless type design contains fewer moving parts making the unit more durable and increasing overall life in addition to an increase in efficiency.  Examples of current brushless products include 36SI, 40SI, and 55SI. Current examples of brush style alternators include 24SI and 28SI.

See also
Oradel Industrial Center

References
 Esther Dittlinger, Anderson: A Pictorial History, copyright 1990, page 104.

External links

 Delco-Remy Clan (1957–1960) – Digitized copies of the Delco-Remy Division newsletter

Pendleton, Indiana
Manufacturing companies established in 1901
Former General Motors subsidiaries
Manufacturing companies based in Indiana
Companies formerly listed on the Nasdaq
1901 establishments in Indiana